is a passenger railway station located in  Kanazawa-ku, Yokohama, Kanagawa Prefecture, Japan, operated by the private railway company Keikyū.

Lines

Station layout
The station consists of two opposed side platforms connected by a footbridge. One track is dual gauge.

Platforms

History
Mutsuura Station opened on February 15, 1943 as a station on the Tokyu Shōnan Line, the predecessor to Keikyū. Initially, the station was intended to service the nearby Ikego Munitions Depot, and its use was restricted to personnel of the Imperial Japanese Navy. The station was also located 500 meters closer to Shinzushi than its present position. In 1948, the Keihin Electric Railway spun out from the Tokyu Corporation, and the station was relocated to its present address on March 1, 1949. A new station building was completed in 1970.

Keikyū introduced station numbering to its stations on 21 October 2010; Mutsuura Station was assigned station number KK51.

Passenger statistics
In fiscal 2019, the station was used by an average of 15,934 passengers daily. 

The passenger figures for previous years are as shown below.

Surrounding area
The station is located in a residential neighborhood.

See also
 List of railway stations in Japan

References

External links

 

Railway stations in Kanagawa Prefecture
Railway stations in Japan opened in 1943
Keikyū Zushi Line
Railway stations in Yokohama